Saareküla may refer to several places in Estonia:
Saareküla, Põlva County, village in Estonia
Saareküla, Saare County, village in Estonia
Saareküla, Viljandi County, village in Estonia